Ray Vega (born July 28, 1961) is an American country and adult contemporary artist.

In the 1980s, Vega performed with his brother, Robert, as The Vega Brothers. The duo were signed by MCA Records and their single "Heartache the Size of Texas" peaked at No. 54 on the Billboard Hot Country Singles chart in 1986. Their music was produced by Jimmy Bowen. After the duo broke up, Vega worked various odd jobs in Nashville.

Vega was signed to BNA Records as a solo artist in 1996. His debut single, "Remember When," peaked at No. 56 on the Hot Country Singles & Tracks chart. The song was produced by Josh Leo. After the disappointing response to the single, release of Vega's debut album, also titled Remember When, was cancelled; promotional copies, however, did enter into the marketplace. Another single, "Even More," failed to chart in the United States, although it reached No. 57 on the RPM Adult Contemporary chart in Canada.

Vega later recorded a pop album, 1999's Geography, that was released in Germany via BMG. Additionally, country artist Dusty Drake recorded a composition of Vega's, entitled "And Then," and released it as his debut single in 2002.

Discography

Albums

Singles

Music videos

References

1961 births
American country singer-songwriters
American male singer-songwriters
Living people
BNA Records artists